Sreepur is a city in central Bangladesh, located in Gazipur District in the division of Dhaka. It is the administrative and urban centre of Sreepur Upazila. About 126,249 people live here which makes this  city  the 36th largest city in Bangladesh.

Geography

Demographics
According to 2011 Bangladesh census the total population of the city is 126249 of which 67160 are males  and 59089 are females with a density of 2692 persons per km2. The number of total household of the city is 31470.

Administration
Sreepur city is governed by a Paurashava named Sreepur municipality which consists of  9 wards and 20 mahallas. Sreepur municipality occupies an area of 46.90 km2 of the total city area. The entire city is administrated by Sreepur municipality.

References

Cities in Bangladesh
Populated places in Dhaka Division